Avelum, Otar Chiladze's fifth novel, is the second to be translated into English.

Translations 
 The Russian translation of Avelum was refused by every publisher in Moscow, even though Chiladze's other novels were best sellers in Russia - Авелум
 The novel published by Garnet Press in 2013. 
 The novel is translated into several languages including German.

References
 Novel in Goodreads.com

1995 novels
20th-century Georgian novels
Novels by Otar Chiladze
Georgian magic realism novels
Philosophical novels